The Reindeer Act or Reindeer Industry Act of 1937 is a United States federal law passed in 1937 by the U.S. Congress and signed into law by President Franklin D. Roosevelt on September 1 of that year. The act effectively prohibited the ownership of reindeer herds in Alaska by non-Native Americans. The act was intended to provide for Alaskan natives and to allow them to establish a self-sustaining industry. Authority to promulgate rules regarding the ownership and maintenance of reindeer herds was delegated to the Bureau of Indian Affairs via the Secretary of the Interior, who banned most transactions to non-natives. 

The act was modeled in part on Norwegian and Swedish policies on the ownership of reindeer by the Sami people of Lapland. Many Sami had arrived in Alaska to manage the reindeer in the 1930s. The Alaskan Sami were required to sell their herds to the government, and many left Alaska after doing so. 

For sixty years the Reindeer Act maintained a native and government monopoly in live reindeer in Alaska. By 1989 the regulations were challenged in court, resulting in a legal distinction between reindeer imported after 1937 by non-Natives and the Native herds. Between 1937 and 1940, the herd population declined drastically as reindeer joined native herds of caribou or were lost on the range. A 1997 decision opened ownership to non-natives.

See also
 Lomen Company, which owned most of the reindeer in Alaska until 1937
 Alaska Reindeer Service, government office involved in the introduction of the reindeer industry to Alaska.

References

75th United States Congress
Alaska Natives and United States law
Native American history of Alaska
Reindeer
Sámi-American history
Territory of Alaska